Sugar Boys FC is a British Virgin Islands football club based in Virgin Gorda, competing in the BVIFA Football League, the top tier of British Virgin Islands football.

Sugar Boys finished second in the 2010–11 season. Sugar Boys also finished second in the 2011–12 season  on both occasions the Islanders team were victors.

Current squad

Achievements
BVIFA National League: 3
2015-16, 2021, 2021-22.
BVIFA Presidents Cup: Winners: 2
2016-17, 2021-22.
The Sugar Boys put the disappointment of losing out on the 2016–17 National League Championship by beating the Islanders 1–0, to win the Presidents Cup in front of a packed vociferous crowd at the A.O. Shirley Ground on Sunday 12 February 2017.

References

External links
 Soccerway

Sugar Boys